John Reilly (1745 – 26 July 1804) was an Anglo-Irish politician. 

Reilly was the Member of Parliament for Blessington in the Irish House of Commons from 1779 until the seat's disenfranchisement under the Acts of Union 1800.

References

1745 births
1804 deaths
18th-century Anglo-Irish people
Irish MPs 1776–1783
Irish MPs 1783–1790
Irish MPs 1790–1797
Irish MPs 1798–1800
Members of the Parliament of Ireland (pre-1801) for County Wicklow constituencies